Vasilios Zogos (born 29 July 1999) is a Greek professional footballer who plays as a centre-back for Bylis

Career
Zogos started his career in smaller Greek teams, his first professional club was PAS Giannina. On the summer of 2018, he was loaned to Italian third tier Alessandria. He made his professional debut in the Coppa Italia Serie C on 10 October 2018 against Albissola, playing 67 minutes as a member of starting team.

In January 2020, Zogos moved to KF Bylis. However, he returned to Greece in October 2020, signing with Trikala.

References

External links
 
 

1999 births
Living people
Footballers from Athens
Greek footballers
Association football defenders
Atromitos F.C. players
PAS Giannina F.C. players
U.S. Alessandria Calcio 1912 players
KF Bylis Ballsh players
Trikala F.C. players
Serie C players
Kategoria Superiore players
Greek expatriate footballers
Greek expatriate sportspeople in Italy
Greek expatriate sportspeople in Albania
Expatriate footballers in Italy
Expatriate footballers in Albania